The Click List: Top 10 Videos is an hour length music video show that airs on the television channel Logo. Viewers vote for their top ten favorite videos online, and each week the winners are counted down in a new episode. An episode usually includes Indie and big label LGBT artists such as Rufus Wainwright, God-Des, Ari Gold, Deadlee, Scissor Sisters, Naked Highway, and Jonny McGovern. Mainstream artists like Madonna, Hilary Duff, Rihanna, and Justin Timberlake have also made the list. 

A few special editions of The Click List: Top 10 Videos have aired in the past, including The Click List: Ultimate Madonna Videos and The Click List: Ultimate Comebacks. The videos for Vogue by Madonna and Believe by Cher were voted into the number one spots, respectively.

External links
 Official voting page on LOGOonline.com

Logo TV original programming
American music chart television shows
2010s American LGBT-related television series